

Seeds 

  Jimmy Connors (semifinals)
  Eliot Teltscher (quarterfinals)
  Yannick Noah (final)
  Aaron Krickstein (2nd round)
  Johan Kriek (3rd round)
  Kevin Curren (quarterfinals)
  Tomáš Šmíd (2nd round)
  Juan Aguilera (2nd round)
 Stefan Edberg (champion)
 Ben Testerman (2nd round)
 Brad Gilbert (quarterfinals)
 Ramesh Krishnan (3rd round)
 Kevin Curren (3rd round)
 David Pate (2nd round)
 Leif Shiras (2nd round)
 Terry Moor (2nd round)

Draw

Final

Top half

Section 1

Section 2

Bottom half

Section 3

Section 4

References
 1985 US National Indoor Draw

1985 Grand Prix (tennis)
1985 Singles